Anubis is an ancient Egyptian god.

Anubis may also refer to:

Entertainment
Anubis (novel), a 2002 novel by Ibrahim Kuni
The Anubis Gates, a 1983 time travel fantasy novel by Tim Powers
Anubis (Stargate), powerful Goa'uld in Stargate SG-1
BeastMaster (TV series) character
Anubis: Zone of the Enders, the Japanese name of PlayStation 2 game Zone of the Enders: The 2nd Runner
Anubis, the name of an orbital frame in the game Zone of the Enders
Anubis Cruger, commander in the Space Patrol Delta in Power Rangers: SPD
Anubis (Black Cat), a character from the anime Black Cat
Anubis (Ronin Warriors), a character from the anime Ronin Warriors
Anubis (comics), a take on the Egyptian deity seen in Marvel Comics
SS Anubis, an area of gameplay in the Nintendo 64 game Jet Force Gemini
Anubis II, a 2005 video game starring the ancient Egyptian god
Anubis, a cheap fighter ship in the space exploration game Freelancer
Anubis, a space colony in the novel 3001: The Final Odyssey
House of Anubis, the English (international) remake of the Dutch Nickelodeon show Het Huis Anubis
 Das Haus Anubis, German remake of House of Anubis
Anubis, a song by Septic Flesh from their 2008 album Communion
 Anubis (cancelled film), a cancelled adaptation of The Anubis Tapestry
 Anubis (2016 film), a Burmese horror film

Species
Anubis (beetle), a genus of beetles
Olive baboon or Anubis baboon, a baboon from the Old World monkey family
Phiomicetus anubis, fossil discovered in 2021

Technology
Anubis (cipher),  a block cipher by Vincent Rijmen and P. S. L. M. Barreto as an entrant in the NESSIE project
GNU Anubis, an outgoing mail processor

Other uses
1912 Anubis, an asteroid
 "Anubis", a disc golf midrange disc by Infinite Discs